The  is a Bo-Bo wheel arrangement AC electric locomotive type operated on passenger and freight services in Japan since 1963. A total of 302 locomotives were built by Hitachi, Mitsubishi, and Toshiba between 1963 and 1976. , just five locomotives remained in service, all operated by JR East.

Variants
 ED75-0: Numbers ED75-1 – 160
 ED75-300: Numbers ED75-301 – 311
 ED75-500: Number ED75-501
 ED75-700: Numbers ED75-701 – 791
 ED75-1000: Numbers ED75-1001 – 1039

ED75-0
This was the original type. Two prototypes, ED75 1 and 2, were delivered in 1963, built by Hitachi and Mitsubishi. Following test running, a further 158 locomotives were built from 1964 by Hitachi, Mitsubishi, and Toshiba. Locomotive numbers 50 to 100 were equipped for cold regions, and were fitted with icicle cutters above the driving cab windows. , no Class ED75-0 locomotives remained in service.

ED75-300
11 Class ED75-300 locomotives were built from 1965 to 1968 by Hitachi and Mitsubishi for use in Kyushu, numbered ED75 301 to ED75 311. These locomotives used a 20 kV AC 60 Hz power supply.

ED75-500
No further locomotives in this sub-class were built, as Class ED76-500 locomotives were instead chosen for this route.

ED75-700
91 Class ED75-700 locomotives were built from 1971 to 1976 by Hitachi, Mitsubishi, and Toshiba, for use on the Ou Main Line and Uetsu Main Line, numbered ED75 701 to ED75 791. These locomotives used a 20 kV AC 50 Hz power supply. These locomotives differed from earlier examples in having PS103 cross-arm type pantographs. 34 members of this subclass were converted to become Class ED79 locomotives in 1988 for use on services through the undersea Seikan Tunnel between Honshu and Hokkaido.

, five Class ED75-700 locomotives remained in service, operated by JR East, with three locomotives based at Sendai and two at Akita.

ED75-1000
The ED75-1000 subclass were built from 1968 for use on express freight services. 25 locomotives were built between 1968 and 1970, followed by a second batch of 14 locomotives built from 1973 to 1976, bringing the total to 39.

JR Freight started a programme of life-extension refurbishment of its Class ED75-1000 fleet from 1993, and refurbished locomotives were initially repainted in a new livery with the bottom half of the body sides finished in ivory. The livery applied to refurbished locomotives was subsequently simplified to just adding a white stripe along the bottom of the body sides.

From the start of the 17 March 2012 timetable revision, the remaining scheduled JR Freight workings using ED75 locomotives, operating in pairs, were completely replaced by JR Freight Class EH500 locomotives.

Livery variations

Preserved examples
, three examples have been preserved, as listed below.
 ED75 1: Sendai Shinkansen Depot in Rifu, Miyagi
 ED75 501: Otaru City Museum, Otaru, Hokkaido
 ED75 775: The Railway Museum in Saitama

Classification

The ED75 classification for this locomotive type is explained below.
 E: Electric locomotive
 D: Four driving axles
 7x: AC locomotive with maximum speed exceeding

See also
 Railway electrification in Japan

References

20 kV AC locomotives
Electric locomotives of Japan
1067 mm gauge locomotives of Japan
Railway locomotives introduced in 1963
Japanese National Railways
East Japan Railway Company
Japan Freight Railway Company